Chauvetia obliqua is a species of sea snail, a marine gastropod mollusk in the family Buccinidae, the true whelks. This name is considered a nomen dubium

Description

Distribution

References

 Segers W., Swinnen F. & De Prins R., 2009. Marine Molluscs of Madeira. Snoeck Publishers, Heule, Belgium, 612 p.

Buccinidae
Gastropods described in 1979